Tomáš Pekhart (born 26 May 1989) is a Czech professional footballer who plays as a forward for Polish club Legia Warsaw. He has represented the Czech Republic at both junior and senior level.

Club career

Early career
Born in Sušice, Czechoslovakia, he began his youth career with his hometown club TJ Sušice and also played for TJ Klatovy before joining Slavia Prague in 2003.

Pekhart joined the Tottenham Hotspur youth academy during the summer of 2006.

Loan to Southampton
In August 2008, Pekhart joined Championship side Southampton on loan until January 2009. He made his first league appearance as a substitute on 14 September, away against Queens Park Rangers which Southampton lost 4–1. He scored his only league goal for Southampton in a 2–2 home draw against Ipswich.

loan to Slavia Prague
He returned to Spurs in January 2009 and on transfer deadline day Pekhart returned to his old club Slavia Prague on a year-long loan until January 2010. On 15 March 2009, Pekhart scored a late goal for Slavia in a 2–1 victory over FK Jablonec. Pekhart was rewarded for his first goal with the club and was handed a start on 22 March, scoring the lone goal in the 1–0 victory over FC Zlín.

FK Jablonec
On 12 January 2010, FK Jablonec confirmed the signing of Pekhart on a three-and-a-half-year deal for an undisclosed fee. On 20 March 2010, Pekhart scored his first goal for Jablonec, a late winner in a 2–1 victory over Příbram. On 2 May 2010, Pekhart scored two goals in a 4–0 victory over Bohemians 1905. On 8 May 2010, Pekhart scored the opening goal in a 3–0 victory over his former club Slavia Prague. Pekhart continued his fine form during the 2010–11 season, scoring 11 goals in 15 league matches. However, after just half of the 2010–11 Gambrinus liga season, he moved on loan to fellow Gambrinus liga side Sparta Prague as part of a deal with 1. FC Nürnberg, whom he joined on 1 July 2011.

loan to Sparta Prague
Pekhart moved on loan for the second half of the 2010–11 season to Sparta Prague. On 19 March 2011, Pekhart scored his first two goals for Sparta in a 2-0 victory over FC Zbrojovka Brno. In nine league games for Sparta, Pekhart scored seven goals. He ended the 2010-11 season scoring 18 goals in 24 matches, one goal behind former teammate David Lafata in the Czech First League scoring table.

Nürnberg
On 6 August 2011, Pekhart scored in his debut in the Bundesliga, helping Nürnberg to a 1–0 victory over Hertha Berlin on the opening day of Germany’s football season. On 1 October 2011, Pekhart scored the equalizer in a 3–3 draw with Mainz. He ended his first season in Germany with 10 goals in 34 matches.

FC Ingolstadt 04
On 28 August 2014, Pekhart signed a three-year deal with the German second league side FC Ingolstadt 04. He made his debut for the club on 31 August, appearing as a second half substitute in a 0–3 victory over SV Sandhausen. While with Ingolstadt Pekhart was seldom used.

AEK Athens
Pekhart moved to AEK Athens on 1 February 2016. On 4 February 2016, he made his debut with the club, in an away 1–1 draw against Iraklis at Kaftanzoglio Stadium. On 20 February 2016, Pekhart scored his first goal for AEK in a 1–1 draw with Iraklis. On 10 April 2016, Pekhart scored two goals in a 2–1 victory over Panionios F.C. During the 2016–17 season, Pekhart was AEK's top scorer, scoring 12 goals in 31 matches.

Hapoel Be'er Sheva
On 21 July 2017, Pekhart signed with Hapoel Be'er Sheva for three years. On 10 August 2017, Pekhart scored his first goal for Hapoel in a 4–2 victory over Bnei Yehuda Tel Aviv in the 2017 Israel Super Cup, claiming his first title with the Israeli side. On 19 August 2017, Pekhart scored his first goal in the Israeli league in a 1–1 draw with Maccabi Netanya. He ended the 2017–18 season scoring 10 goals in 28 matches, helping Hapoel win its fifth league title.

Las Palmas
On 13 August of the following year, he agreed to a two-year deal with Segunda División side UD Las Palmas. Pekhart scored his first goal for Las Palmas on 18 November 2018 in a 4–1 loss to Cádiz CF. On 27 September 2019, he scored his club's third goal in a 3–2 victory over Albacete Balompié. With the trio of Pekhart, Pedri, and Jonathan Viera Las Palmas went on an unbeaten run to move up the Segunda Division standings. On 5 October 2019, Pedri and Pekhart goals helped the island side to a 0–2 victory over CD Lugo. On 13 October 2019, Las Palmas won their fourth straight match, defeating Deportivo La Coruña 3–0 with two goals by Pekhart and one by Jonathan Viera.

Legia Warsaw
On 10 February 2020, Pekhart agreed to a two-and-a-half-year deal with Ekstraklasa side Legia Warsaw. On 22 February 2020, Pekhart made his debut for Legia, scoring his club's fourth goal in a 4–0 victory over Jagiellonia Białystok. On 7 June 2020, Pekhart scored two goals to help Legia to a 1–3 victory over Wisła Kraków. He ended his first season in Poland appearing in 11 league matches scoring 5 goals, helping Legia to a league title.

On 21 March 2021, Pekhart scored four goals in a 4–0 victory over Zagłębie Lubin. During the 2020–21 season, he was the leading scorer in Ekstraklasa, scoring 22 goals as Legia won the league title again. On 14 July 2021, Pekhard scored the second goal in a 2–0 victory in the second leg of the first round of UEFA Champions League qualifying against FK Bodø/Glimt as the Polish champions advanced to the next round. Pekhart ended the 2021–22 season in Poland appearing in 45 matches and scoring 10 goals, in a season in which Legia finished 10th in the  league standings. After rejecting offers to renew his contract by Legia, Pekhart left the Polish club on 30 June 2022.

Gaziantep
On 10 August 2022, Pekhart joined Gaziantep in Turkey on a two-year contract.

Return to Legia Warsaw
On 30 January 2023, Pekhart agreed to a one-and-a-half-year deal with Ekstraklasa side Legia Warsaw.

International career
Pekhart has represented his country at youth international level. Pekhart played and scored in the final of the 2006 UEFA Under-17 Championship in Luxembourg for his country against Russia.

In 2007, he represented his country in the FIFA Under-20 World Cup in Canada as the youngest player in the squad having just turned 18. He played in all seven matches of the tournament, including the final against Argentina in which the Czechs finished runners up after Mauro Zárate scored the winning goal four minutes from full-time for Argentina.

He made his debut for the Czech Republic on 22 May 2010 in a match against Turkey.

Career statistics

Club

International
Scores and results list the Czech Republic's goal tally first, score column indicates score after each Pekhart goal.

Honours
AEK Athens
Greek Cup: 2015–16

Hapoel Be'er-Sheva
Israeli Premier League: 2017–18

Legia Warsaw
Ekstraklasa: 2019–20, 2020–21

Czech Republic U17
UEFA European Under-17 Championship runner-up: 2006

Czech Republic U20
FIFA U-20 World Cup runner-up: 2007

Individual
Ekstraklasa top scorer: 2020–21 (22 goals)
Ekstraklasa Forward of the Season: 2020–21

References

External links

1989 births
Living people
People from Sušice
Czech footballers
Association football forwards
SK Slavia Prague players
Tottenham Hotspur F.C. players
Southampton F.C. players
FK Jablonec players
AC Sparta Prague players
1. FC Nürnberg players
FC Ingolstadt 04 players
AEK Athens F.C. players
Hapoel Be'er Sheva F.C. players
UD Las Palmas players
Legia Warsaw players
Gaziantep F.K. footballers
English Football League players
Czech First League players
Super League Greece players
Bundesliga players
Segunda División players
Ekstraklasa players
Süper Lig players
Czech Republic youth international footballers
Czech Republic under-21 international footballers
Czech Republic international footballers
UEFA Euro 2012 players
UEFA Euro 2020 players
Czech expatriate footballers
Czech expatriate sportspeople in England
Czech expatriate sportspeople in Germany
Czech expatriate sportspeople in Greece
Czech expatriate sportspeople in Israel
Czech expatriate sportspeople in Spain
Czech expatriate sportspeople in Poland
Czech expatriate sportspeople in Turkey
Expatriate footballers in England
Expatriate footballers in Germany
Expatriate footballers in Greece
Expatriate footballers in Israel
Expatriate footballers in Spain
Expatriate footballers in Poland
Expatriate footballers in Turkey
Sportspeople from the Plzeň Region